Qingjiang Road is a station on Line 3 of the Qingdao Metro. It opened on 18 December 2016.

Gallery

References

Qingdao Metro stations
Railway stations in China opened in 2016